Elsdon is a suburb of the New Zealand city of Porirua located immediately to the west to of the city's CBD. The area was named after Elsdon Best, a historian who studied archaeological sites in the area. Its industrial area, the largest in the city, is known for housing the factory used by New Zealand chocolate company Whittaker's; constructed in 1969, it remains the company's sole production site to this day.

Demographics 
Elsdon is combined with the neighbouring suburb of Takapūwāhia for statistical purposes.

Elsdon-Takapuwahia had a population of 2,418 at the 2018 New Zealand census, an increase of 261 people (12.1%) since the 2013 census, and an increase of 201 people (9.1%) since the 2006 census. There were 696 households. There were 1,194 males and 1,224 females, giving a sex ratio of 0.98 males per female. The median age was 31.1 years (compared with 37.4 years nationally), with 603 people (24.9%) aged under 15 years, 582 (24.1%) aged 15 to 29, 996 (41.2%) aged 30 to 64, and 240 (9.9%) aged 65 or older.

The proportion of people born overseas was 18.5%, compared with 27.1% nationally.

Although some people objected to giving their religion, 41.7% had no religion, 44.3% were Christian, 1.9% were Hindu, 0.5% were Muslim, 0.6% were Buddhist and 4.0% had other religions.

Of those at least 15 years old, 267 (14.7%) people had a bachelor or higher degree, and 399 (22.0%) people had no formal qualifications. The employment status of those at least 15 was that 849 (46.8%) people were employed full-time, 243 (13.4%) were part-time, and 135 (7.4%) were unemployed.

The census revealed numerous trends in the area that differ from New Zealand as a whole. Ethnically, the statistical area was 52.9% Māori, 47.8% European, 28.7% Pacific peoples, 10% Asian, 0.7% MELAA, and 0.6% other. Meanwhile, New Zealand in its entirety is 70.2% European and only 16.5% Māori. Other differences include a larger Christian population (44.3% in the area compared to 36.5% nationally) and lower median income ($25,700 in the area compared to $31,800 nationally).

Education 
Porirua School, a co-educational state primary school for Years 1 to 6, is located in Elsdon.

OneSchool Global, a co-educational private composite school for Years 1 to 13 with numerous international sites, has a campus in the suburb.

High school students living in Elsdon are zoned for the state secondary school Mana College in Takapūwāhia.

References 

Suburbs of Porirua